Cathleen Synge Morawetz (May 5, 1923 – August 8, 2017) was a Canadian mathematician who spent much of her career in the United States. Morawetz's research was mainly in the study of the partial differential equations governing fluid flow, particularly those of mixed type occurring in transonic flow. She was professor emerita at the Courant Institute of Mathematical Sciences at the New York University, where she had also served as director from 1984 to 1988. She was awarded the National Medal of Science in 1998.

Childhood
Morawetz's father, John Lighton Synge, nephew of John Millington Synge, was an Irish mathematician, specializing in the geometry of general relativity. Her mother also studied mathematics for a time. Her uncle was Edward Hutchinson Synge who is credited as the inventor of the Near-field scanning optical microscope and very large astronomical telescopes, based on multiple mirrors.

Her childhood was split between Ireland and Canada. Both her parents were supportive of her interest in mathematics and science, and it was a woman mathematician, Cecilia Krieger, who had been a family friend for many years who later encouraged Morawetz to pursue a Ph.D. in mathematics. Morawetz said her father was influential in stimulating her interest in mathematics, but he wondered whether her studying mathematics would be wise (suggesting they might fight like the Bernoulli brothers).

Education
A graduate of the University of Toronto in 1945, Morawetz received her master's degree in 1946 at the Massachusetts Institute of Technology. Morawetz got a job at New York University where she edited Supersonic Flow and Shock Waves by Richard Courant and Kurt Otto Friedrichs. She earned her Ph.D. in 1951 at New York University, with a thesis on the stability of a spherical implosion, under the supervision of Kurt Otto Friedrichs. Her thesis was entitled Contracting Spherical Shocks Treated by a Perturbation Method

Career
After earning her doctorate, Morawetz spent a year as a research associate at MIT before returning to work as a research associate at the Courant Institute of Mathematical Sciences at NYU, for five more years. During this time she had no teaching requirements and could focus purely on research. She published work on a variety of topics in applied mathematics including viscosity, compressible fluids and transonic flows. Even if an aircraft remains subsonic, the air flowing around the wing can reach supersonic velocity. The mix of air at supersonic and subsonic velocity creates shock waves that can slow the airplane.

Turning to the mathematics of transonic flow, she showed that specially designed shockless airfoils could not, in fact, prevent shocks.  Shocks developed in response to even small perturbations, such as a gust of wind or an imperfection in a wing. This discovery opened up the problem of developing a theory for a flow with shocks. Subsequently, the shocks she predicted mathematically now have been observed in experiments as air flows around the wing of a plane.

In 1957 she became an assistant professor at Courant.  At this point she began to work more closely with her colleagues publishing important joint papers with Peter Lax and Ralph Phillips on the decay of solutions to the wave equation around a star shaped obstacle. She continued with important solo work on the wave equation and transonic flow around a profile until she was promoted to full professor by 1965.

At this point her research expanded to a variety of problems including papers on the Tricomi equation the nonrelativistic wave equation including questions of decay and scattering. Her first doctoral student, Lesley Sibner, was graduated in 1964. In the 1970s she worked on questions of scattering theory and the nonlinear wave equation. She proved what is now known as the Morawetz Inequality. She died on August 8, 2017, in New York City.

Honors

In 1980 Morawetz won a Lester R. Ford Award. In 1981, she became the first woman to deliver the Gibbs Lecture of The American Mathematical Society, and in 1982 presented an Invited Address at a meeting of the Society for Industrial and Applied Mathematics. She received honorary degrees from Eastern Michigan University in 1980, Brown University, and Smith College in 1982, and Princeton in 1990. In 1983 and in 1988, she was selected as a Noether Lecturer. She was elected to the American Academy of Arts and Sciences in 1984. She was named Outstanding Woman Scientist for 1993 by the Association for Women in Science. In 1995, she became the second woman elected to the office of president of the American Mathematical Society. In 1996, she was awarded an honorary ScD degree by Trinity College Dublin, where her father JL Synge had been a student and later a faculty member. That same year, she was elected to the American Philosophical Society. In 1998 she was awarded the National Medal of Science; she was the first woman to receive the medal for work in mathematics. In 2004 she received the Leroy P. Steele Prize for Lifetime Achievement. In 2006 she won the George David Birkhoff Prize in Applied Mathematics. In 2012 she became a fellow of the American Mathematical Society.

Morawetz was a member of the National Academy of Sciences and was the first woman to belong to the Applied Mathematics Section of that organization.

Publications

Personal life
Morawetz lived in Greenwich Village with her husband Herbert Morawetz, a polymer chemist. They had four children, eight grandchildren, and three great grandchildren. Their children are Pegeen Rubinstein, John, Lida Jeck, and Nancy Morawetz (a professor at New York University School of Law who manages its Immigrant Rights Clinic).

Upon being honored by the National Organization for Women for successfully combining career and family, Morawetz quipped, "Maybe I became a mathematician because I was so crummy at housework." She said her current non-mathematical interests are "grandchildren and sailing."

References

External links

1923 births
2017 deaths
Canadian women academics
Massachusetts Institute of Technology alumni
Mathematical analysts
National Medal of Science laureates
Courant Institute of Mathematical Sciences alumni
Courant Institute of Mathematical Sciences faculty
PDE theorists
University of Toronto alumni
Canadian women mathematicians
Fellows of the Society for Industrial and Applied Mathematics
Fellows of the American Mathematical Society
Presidents of the American Mathematical Society
Members of the United States National Academy of Sciences
Scientists from New York City
Scientists from Toronto
New York University alumni
20th-century women mathematicians
20th-century Canadian mathematicians
21st-century Canadian mathematicians
21st-century women mathematicians
Mathematicians from New York (state)
Canadian expatriates in the United States
Members of the American Philosophical Society